"Rango" is the second single by Welsh indie rock band Catfish and the Bottlemen. The song was included in their EP, Kathleen and the Other Three, and their debut studio album, The Balcony. The single was released on 13 August 2013.

Lyrics 
The song was about Van's first ever girlfriend, named Abby, whom the song is written for. McCann said he wrote the song when he was about 16. He described the relationship between him and Abby as one that didn't work out, although they remained friends and Van also stated in an interview that he wrote the song to try and get her back, but she did not like it. Then when it got on the radio she was flattered by it and wanted to get back together with him, but Van refused.

Music video 
The EP version of the music video was released on 3 September 2013. The video is an animation about a sperm cell named Rango who is determined to make a name for himself and be the fastest sperm to fertilize the egg. The video ends with Rango winning the race, where he is consumed by the egg. The video was directed by Pedro Chaves. Animation for the music video was done by Chaves, Turid Hoekstra and Dream Journey Studios.

Track listing

Critical reception 
BBC's Tom Young praised the song as "glorious", and included it on his BBC playlist of upcoming artists. The Red Brick, the official student newspaper for the University of Birmingham described the song as intriguing.

References

External links 
Rango - Single at Discogs
Rango - Single at ELI

2013 singles
2013 songs
Catfish and the Bottlemen songs
Island Records singles
Song recordings produced by Jim Abbiss